The 1978 United States Grand Prix West (officially the Long Beach Grand Prix) was a Formula One motor race held on April 2, 1978, at Long Beach, California.

Summary
Carlos Reutemann took over at the halfway mark from Ferrari teammate Gilles Villeneuve, when the Canadian crashed out of the lead, and won by eleven seconds. It was the second American victory for the Argentine, who also won for Brabham at Watkins Glen in 1974. American Mario Andretti finished second to maintain a share of the Championship lead with Reutemann.

At the start of the weekend, though only 22 cars would make the grid, there were 30 entries, requiring a one-hour pre-qualifying session on Friday morning for the eight non-FICA members. From these eight, the fastest four would join the rest of the field in qualifying for one of the 22 starting spots.

Niki Lauda, who had placed his Ferrari on pole for the previous year's race, again set the early pace, this time in a Brabham. Late in the Friday morning session, however, Reutemann suddenly jumped to the top of the sheets with a 1:20.99 and eventually posted the day's best of 1:20.636. As usual at Long Beach, a number of drivers suffered from broken gearboxes, and on Saturday, though the weather was better, no one was able to better Reutemann's time. The first three rows of the final grid were occupied by just three teams, as Villeneuve completed the all-Ferrari front row, Brabham teammates Lauda and John Watson were third and fifth, and the Lotus pair of Andretti and Ronnie Peterson were fourth and sixth.

A beautiful California day and 75,000 paying fans showed up for the race on Sunday. The start had been moved from in front of the pits on Ocean Boulevard to the curving "straight" on Shoreline Drive in order to avoid another first corner tangle. The strategy seemed to work, as everyone got through cleanly, though John Watson's late braking maneuver down the inside caused him to exit wide from the hairpin and force polesitter Reutemann wide with him, so Villeneuve tucked into the lead as they exited.

After one lap, the order was Villeneuve, Watson, Lauda, Reutemann, Andretti, Alan Jones, James Hunt and Peterson. In the lead of a Grand Prix for the first time, Villeneuve was driving superbly, as he began to extend his lead. On lap six, Hunt struck the wall at the apex of the last turn before the pit straight and knocked his right front wheel off. Three laps later, Watson retired from second with a blown engine. Andretti was dropping back in fourth, having chosen the wrong Goodyears and a poor top gear, and Jones was closing on him quickly. On lap 19, the Williams went through and took off after Reutemann.

With Villeneuve's lead at two seconds, Reutemann was pushing Lauda hard for second place. Suddenly, on lap 28, the Brabham went straight on at Turn One, looking as if his brakes had failed. Lauda stopped safely, however, stepped out and removed his helmet. An electrical failure had cut the motor. Meanwhile, Jones had caught up to Reutemann, and the top three were separated by just 2.5 seconds.

On lap 39, just before the halfway point, Villeneuve came up to lap Clay Regazzoni, who was in a battle with Jean-Pierre Jabouille's Renault. Rather than wait until the straight, the Canadian tried to get by in the twisty section leading up to Ocean Boulevard. There simply wasn't room, however, and, when Regazzoni braked earlier than Villeneuve expected, the Ferrari's right front wheel hit the left rear of the Shadow and was launched over the white car into the wall. Fortunately, no one was hurt.

This left Reutemann in the lead, ahead of Jones, then a long gap back to Andretti. Lap after lap, Jones hounded Reutemann, but the Ferrari was too fast down the straight for him to get by. On about lap 47, with Jones still on the Ferrari's tail, the front wings of the Williams strangely flopped down, the result of a fabrication failure. Jones continued to battle, but began losing around a second a lap. Adding to the Aussie's misery, his fuel pressure began fluctuating. His head jerked back and forth as the engine sputtered and, sometimes, cut out entirely. As one car after another passed, the struggling Williams fell all the way to eighth place. Recording the fastest lap of the race on lap 27 and repassing Emerson Fittipaldi on the last lap for seventh place were his only consolations after a spectacular drive.

Reutemann cruised to the finish, maintaining a twelve to fifteen second gap over Andretti, who had a similar cushion over Patrick Depailler in third.

Classification

Pre-qualifying

*Positions in red indicate entries that failed to pre-qualify.

Qualifying

*Positions in red indicate entries that failed to qualify.

Race

Championship standings after the race

Drivers' Championship standings

Constructors' Championship standings

Note: Only the top five positions are included for both sets of standings.

References

Further reading
 Rob Walker (July, 1978). "3rd United States Grand Prix West: Road Show". Road & Track, 135–140.

United States Grand Prix West
United States Grand Prix West
1978 in American motorsport
United States Grand Prix West
United States Grand Prix West